Robert Ojo (29 April 1941 – 27 March 2014) was a Nigerian sprinter. He competed in the men's 100 metres at the 1968 Summer Olympics.

References

External links

1941 births
2014 deaths
Athletes (track and field) at the 1968 Summer Olympics
Athletes (track and field) at the 1972 Summer Olympics
Nigerian male sprinters
Olympic athletes of Nigeria
Athletes (track and field) at the 1970 British Commonwealth Games
Commonwealth Games competitors for Nigeria
20th-century Nigerian people